Steve Thomas Lacy-Moya (born May 23, 1998) is an American singer-songwriter, guitarist, and record producer. He gained recognition as the guitarist of the alternative R&B band the Internet. In 2017, he released his self-produced debut EP, Steve Lacy's Demo. Following this, Lacy was featured alongside Frank Ocean on the song "911 / Mr. Lonely" by Tyler, the Creator; and co-wrote songs for artists such as Solange Knowles, Chloe x Halle, and Kendrick Lamar, the latter of whom he worked with on the song "Pride".

His debut studio album, Apollo XXI (2019), earned him a nomination for Best Urban Contemporary Album at the 62nd Annual Grammy Awards. That same year, he was featured on the single "Sunflower" by Vampire Weekend. He then collaborated with Calvin Harris (under the moniker Love Regenerator) on the song "Live Without Your Love", which earned him a chart entry in the United Kingdom.

His second studio album, Gemini Rights (2022), peaked within the top ten of the Billboard 200 chart. The album spawned the single "Bad Habit", which became Lacy's first song to reach number one on the Billboard Hot 100 after going viral on TikTok, where a snippet of the song was used as the soundtrack for over 400,000 videos on the platform. It earned him two Grammy Award nominations for Record of the Year and Song of the Year, with its parent album winning Best Progressive R&B Album.

Early life 
Steve Thomas Lacy-Moya was born in Compton, California, on May 23, 1998, the son of an African-American mother and Filipino father. He was raised by his mother, with his father being largely absent from his life and usually only visiting on special occasions. When Lacy was 10 years old, his father passed away. Lacy attended Washington Preparatory High School before moving onto a private school. Lacy has said that he grew up sheltered, a result of his mother wanting to shield him and his sisters from the environment at the time in Compton.

Career 
Lacy first gained an interest in the guitar at the age of seven through the video game Guitar Hero, but soon wanted to learn how to play on an actual guitar. He met Jameel Bruner, his future bandmate in the Internet, while in the jazz band at high school. He produced and performed his first songs on his iPhone, using a plug-in for his guitar called an iRig. In 2013, he began a producing role on what would become the Internet's third studio album, Ego Death. Contributing on the production of eight tracks, Ego Death was nominated at the 58th Annual Grammy Awards for Best Urban Contemporary Album. Lacy appeared on Matt Martians' album The Drum Chord Theory and Syd's album Fin after it was announced that the Internet members would release solo projects. He also began producing songs for Twenty88, Denzel Curry, Isaiah Rashad, J. Cole, GoldLink, and Kendrick Lamar, most notably producing the song "Pride" from Lamar's Grammy-winning album Damn, and making two guest appearances on the Vampire Weekend album Father of the Bride.

Steve Lacy's Demo was released on February 17, 2017, with Lacy once again creating most of the songs on his iPhone by producing the guitar and bass arrangements through it and singing his vocals directly into its built-in microphone. He also programmed the drum patterns in Ableton Live. That year, he also co-wrote and produced Ravyn Lenae's EP Crush, which was eventually released in February 2018. He reunited with the Internet to work on their album Hive Mind, which was released in July 2018. Lacy went on to produce for Solange, Kali Uchis on her debut album Isolation, Mac Miller on his album Swimming, and was featured on Dev Hynes' album Negro Swan.

In 2018, Lacy said that he had produced for rapper YG, and that he had begun using devices other than his phone to produce music. In March 2019, he was credited for producing on two tracks on Solange's album When I Get Home. He was also featured on the Vampire Weekend song "Sunflower" and appeared its video that same month. In April, he released the single "N Side" from his debut album Apollo XXI. He announced the release date of Apollo XXI to be on May 24, 2019. In the week of his album debut, he released two more singles, "Playground" and "Hate CD". The album was nominated for Best Urban Contemporary Album at the 62nd Annual Grammy Awards, Lacy's first Grammy nomination as a solo artist.

On December 4, 2020, Lacy released a compilation album of his early work titled The Lo-Fis. His single "Mercury" was released with a music video on June 16, 2022. The video featured on YouTube is about half as long as the version published on Spotify, which spans 4:58 minutes compared to the 2:30 minutes of the video. His second studio album, Gemini Rights, was released on July 15, 2022. On November 5, 2022, he performed  "Bad Habit" and "Helmet" on Saturday Night Live.

On January 31, 2023, AEG (Anschutz Entertainment Group) Presents announced that Lacy would be one of three headline acts at the inaugural Re:SET Concert Series.

Artistry 
In an interview with The Fader, Lacy cited Thundercat, Erykah Badu, Black Moth Super Rainbow, Pharrell Williams and the Neptunes as some of his biggest influences, also mentioning Prince as his dream collaborator. Lacy has also listed Weezer, Paramore, and Jimi Hendrix as major influences on his sound. Makeda Sandford of Saint Heron described his sound as "an electrifying yet smooth... playful depiction of beachy funk, rock 'n roll-sprinkled soul." Jonah Bromwich of Pitchfork said he "sparkles with classic Southern California funk and soul." He has also stated that one of his biggest influences, in regard to production, is Mac DeMarco. Lacy has said that he is most comfortable writing about topics regarding love and dating, and describes his musical sound to be like the tartan fabric 'plaid'.

Personal life 
In 2017, Lacy came out out as bisexual.

On February 16th, 2023, Lacy appeared on popular artist interviewer's show, Nardwuar the Human Serviette.

Discography

Albums 
Apollo XXI (2019)
Gemini Rights (2022)

Compilation albums
The Lo-Fis (2020)

Extended plays 
Steve Lacy's Demo (2017)

With the Internet

Ego Death (2015)
Hive Mind (2018)

Awards and nominations

References

External links
 Steve Lacy on SoundCloud

1998 births
Living people
20th-century LGBT people
21st-century African-American male singers
21st-century American guitarists
21st-century LGBT people
African-American guitarists
American contemporary R&B singers
American male guitarists
Bisexual men
Bisexual musicians
Guitarists from California
LGBT African Americans
LGBT record producers
American LGBT singers
Musicians from Compton, California
Record producers from California
American people of Filipino descent
Grammy Award winners